Acyl-CoA synthetase medium chain family member 2A is a protein that in humans is encoded by the ACSM2A gene.

Function

This gene encodes a mitochondrial acyl-coenzyme A synthetase that is specific for medium chain fatty acids. These enzymes catalyze fatty acid activation, the first step of fatty acid metabolism, through the transfer of acyl-CoA. These enzymes also participate in the glycine conjugation pathway in the detoxification of xenobiotics such as benzoate and ibuprofen. Expression levels of this gene in the kidney may be correlated with kidney function. This gene and its paralog ACSM2B (Gene ID: 348158), both present on chromosome 16, likely arose from a chromosomal duplication event. [provided by RefSeq, May 2017].

References

Further reading